The 1973 New Hampshire Wildcats football team was an American football team that represented the University of New Hampshire as a member of the Yankee Conference during the 1973 NCAA Division II football season. In its second year under head coach Bill Bowes, the team compiled a 4–5 record (2–3 against conference opponents) and tied for fourth place out of six teams in the Yankee Conference.

Schedule

References

New Hampshire
New Hampshire Wildcats football seasons
New Hampshire Wildcats football